Lapan may refer to:

People
 Ngala Lapan, Papua New Guinean rugby league player
 Pete Lapan (1891–1953), American baseball player

Places
 Lapan, Cher, Centre-Val de Loire, France

Other
 LAPAN or National Institute of Aeronautics and Space, Indonesian government space agency